Diversified Communications is a multimedia company, headquartered in Portland, Maine.  The company provides market access, education and information through global, national and regional face-to-face events, digital products and publications.

History 
Diversified was founded in 1949 when Horace A. Hildreth, the former governor of Maine, president of Bucknell University and U.S. ambassador to Pakistan, purchased Community Broadcasting Service, owner of Maine's oldest radio station, WABI in Bangor. In 1953, he launched Maine's first TV station, WABI-TV in Bangor.

In 1970, Diversified entered the publishing and trade show business with the acquisition of National Fisherman and FISH EXPO Boston. In 1972, it formed New England Cablevision which it sold in 2000.

Throughout the 1980s, Diversified expanded its publishing and trade show business with products in the commercial marine and seafood industries. In 1993, it expanded internationally with the European Seafood Exposition. Diversified continued its international growth with the acquisition of Australia Exhibition Services in 2000, the formation of DBC Canada and the acquisition of UK-based Full Moon Communications in 2002. In 2004 it joined Menachem Lubinsky of Lubicom Marketing and Consulting to co-produce Kosherfest, a two-day trade show for the kosher-certified food industry started in 1989. In 2009, Diversified expanded into Hong Kong with the acquisition of Asia Business Events and established a presence in India with the acquisition of Infocast.

On July 15, 2014, the contracts that Diversified Communications had with Dish Network expired. Among the issues Diversified cited included financial terms, customer service issues between the station and Dish Network, and, in Bangor, viewership changes on Dish's part in several counties to another CBS station on account of DMA location (including WGME in the Portland area). After a breakdown on contract talks, which picked up slowly, an agreement was reached on October 8, 2014, allowing both stations to return to Dish Network later that day.

On February 16, 2017, it was announced that WABI-TV and sister station WCJB-TV in Gainesville, Florida would be sold to Gray Television for $85 million, pending FCC approval. It will make WCJB a sister station to WCTV (Gray Television's then-flagship station) in Tallahassee and WJHG-TV and WECP-LD in Panama City, while reuniting WABI-TV with WAGM-TV (which Gray acquired two years prior) in Presque Isle, Maine. The sale was completed on May 1, 2017.

Properties 

Today, Diversified operates trade fairs on four continents, produces trade publications, and owns several digital businesses. SPAR Point Group, which focuses on the 3D imaging technologies sector, is a wholly owned subsidiary of Diversified.

Former Diversified-owned stations
Stations arranged alphabetically by state and by city of license.

Television stations
Note:
 (**) – Indicates a station built and signed on by Community Broadcasting Service/Diversified Communications.

Notes:
1 This station was owned by Mount Washington Television, whose ownership partially overlapped with Community Broadcasting Service.
2 This station was owned by Atlantic Media Group, but was operated by Diversified under a local marketing agreement from its sign on in 1994 until Diversified sold operating station WPDE-TV to Barrington Broadcasting in 2006.

Radio stations

Note:
1 This station was owned by Mount Washington Television, whose ownership partially overlapped with Community Broadcasting Service..

References

External links 
 Diversified Communications

Mass media companies established in 1949
1949 establishments in Maine
2002 mergers and acquisitions
2009 mergers and acquisitions
2017 mergers and acquisitions
Companies based in Portland, Maine
Mass media in Portland, Maine
Gray Television